Eupithecia albigutta is a moth in the family Geometridae. It is found in the Himalaya and Taiwan.

References

Moths described in 1958
albigutta
Moths of Asia